Josef Michael Holyman (born 10 June 1970 in Launceston, Tasmania) was an Australian cricketer who played for the Tasmanian Tigers.

See also
 List of Tasmanian representative cricketers

External links
 

1970 births
Living people
Tasmania cricketers
Australian cricketers
Cricketers from Launceston, Tasmania
Wicket-keepers